The New Albany Downtown Historic District is a national historic district located at New Albany, Indiana.  The general area is W. First Street to the west, Spring St. to the north, E. Fifth Street to the east, and Main Street to the south.  The local specification of the district is between East Fifth Street to West Fifth Street, Culbertson Street to the north, and the Ohio River to the south.  East Spring Street Historic District is immediately east of the area, and the Main Street section of the Mansion Row Historic District starts.  The area includes the Scribner House, where the founders of New Albany lived.  It is also the focal area of the Harvest Homecoming Festival every October.

Architectural styles vary, including Beaux-Arts, Chicago Commercial, Federal, Greek Revival, Italianate, Neoclassical, and Renaissance Revival.  Prominent buildings in the district include:
Elsby Building (1916, Neoclassical)
Firestone Building (1937, Art Moderne)
New Albany Carnegie Library (1902): Now the Carnegie Center for Art and History
Sears Automotive (Art Deco)
Town Clock Church (1852, Greek Revival):  Originally the Second Presbyterian Church and served the Underground Railroad, it is now the Second Baptist Church.
Woolworth Building (1910, Chicago Commercial): Site of the chain's first luncheonette.

It was listed on the National Register of Historic Places in 1999.

Gallery

See also
 List of attractions and events in the Louisville metropolitan area

References

 http://www.newalbanypreservation.com/uploads/File/designguidelines/NAguides-Downtown.pdf
 https://web.archive.org/web/20120206235321/http://www.countyhistory.com/fchs/tour.html

Historic districts in New Albany, Indiana
F. W. Woolworth Company buildings and structures
National Register of Historic Places in Floyd County, Indiana
Populated places on the Underground Railroad
Federal architecture in Indiana
Italianate architecture in Indiana
Historic districts on the National Register of Historic Places in Indiana